Chudov or Tchoudov (from чудо meaning miracle) is a Russian masculine surname, its feminine counterpart is Chudova. It may refer to
Maxim Tchoudov (born 1982), Russian biathlete
Tatyana Chudova (1944–2021), Russian composer

Russian-language surnames